George Glover Campbell (2 March 1887 – 3 September 1967) was an Australian politician who represented the Electoral district of Hamilton from 1950 till 1959 for the Labor Party.

Early life
Born in England to parents Isaac Campbell, a grocer, and Susannah Patterson, Campbell Jr arrived in Australia in 1905. He lived at Drummoyne and worked in Sydney harbour shipyards. He moved to Newcastle in 1907, and was employed in State Dockyard at Walsh Island. He remained at the dockyards until being employed in parliament.

Political career
Campbell was President of Merewether branch and of Hamilton state electorate council for some years. He was an Alderman on Merewether council. He contested the hard Labor seat of Electoral district of Hamilton at the 1950 state election and won. Campbell subsequently won re-election at the 1953, and 1956 state elections but lost pre-selection to Robert McCartney at the 1959 State election., Campbell resigned from the Labor Party in 1959 in protest and never rejoined.

Death
He is buried at Beresfield Cemetery.

References

 

1887 births
1967 deaths
Members of the New South Wales Legislative Assembly
People from Barrow-in-Furness
Australian Labor Party members of the Parliament of New South Wales
20th-century Australian politicians